Furia is a genus of fungi within the family of Entomophthoraceae of the Zygomycota. This has been supported by molecular phylogenetic analysis (Gryganskyi et al. 2012).

Originally created in 1966 by Polish mycologist Andrzej Batko (1933-1997), as a subgenus of Zoophthora, The genus name of Furia is derived from the Latin furia -  this is due to stress the destructive effect of the epizootic of this type species of the subgenus in populations of Lepidoptera caterpillars. American mycologist Richard A. Humber raised Furia to the generic level.

Distribution
It has been recorded being found mainly in America and Europe (especially in Great Britain) also Spain, with a few sparse discoveries world wide, such as Mexico, and Brazil. In Poland and Austria, and a few other parts of Europe, the presence of the fungus Furia shandongensi  has been found on earwigs.

Species notes
Furia ithacensis is a species of the pathogenic fungus in America that causes a fatal disease in flies, specifically snipe flies (Rhagio sp.). The infected 'zombified' fly-host makes its a journey to some vegetation, normally the underside of a leaf and most often during the evening hours. By morning, the fly will already have been dead for hours. Its fungus-ridden cadaver will be perched on the leaf with its wings spread as though ready to take flight. Its dead body is bound to the leaf by hundreds of hyphae. The hyphae are specialized so that they grab the leaf with a strong sucker-like protrusions. The cadaver attracts new fly victims, especially searching males that are prompted by their sexual attraction to these flies. During the night, the fungus had been busy producing and expelling spores. These spores showered the environment surrounding the fly cadaver like fungal bullets of death. So, as curious flies and also males inspect the cadaver, they pick up the fungal spores, and the infection cycle starts again.

The forest tent caterpillar (FTC), Malacosoma disstria  (Lepidoptera: Lasiocampidae), is a cyclic defoliator (leaf eater) of North American forests, including Florida, and from Maryland and New York (state). Furia crustosa is now classed as a synonym of Furia gastropachae. The fungus Furia gastropachae  has long been associated with FTC population decline. The species of fungus rarely infects species outside the genus Malacosoma. In 2002, Resting spores were observed even within the cadavers infected by other resting spores, a phenomenon not previously observed among the Entomophthorales. This allows the fungus to initiate cycles of secondary infection via conidia'. Also, host infection by resting spores was highest at intermediate levels of soil moisture. Infection of fourth instar larvae by resting spores and conidia was maximized at cooler temperatures (of 10 to 20 °C).

Furia vomitoriae affects bluebottle flies (Diptera: Calliphoridae). It forms masses of conidiophores erupting through the intersegmental areas (or clear bands) on the abdominal dorsum of the flies in Mexico.

Furia virescens  infects moth species of Agrotis, causing black, shrivelled larva and Furia montana infects adult two-winged flies of the species Dipters.

Species
As accepted by Species Fungorum;

Furia americana 
Furia creatonoti 
Furia ellisiana 
Furia fujiana 
Furia fumimontana 
Furia gastropachae 
Furia ithacensis 
Furia montana 
Furia neopyralidarum 
Furia pieris 
Furia shandongensis 
Furia virescens 
Furia vomitoriae 
Furia zabri 

Former species; (all family Entomophthoraceae)
 F. crustosa  = Furia gastropachae
 F. gloeospora  = Pandora gloeospora
 F. triangularis  = Erynia triangularis

References

External links
 

Entomophthorales
Zygomycota genera